Jan Marian Olbrycht (born 21 September 1952, in Rybnik) is a Polish politician of the Civic Platform who has been serving Member of the European Parliament (MEP) for Silesian Voivodeship since 2004. Olbrycht sits as part of the European People's Party. Before entering European politics, he was the first Marshal of Silesian Voivodeship between 1999 and 2002.

Education
 1984: Doctor of Sociology, Jagiellonian University
 Lecturer

Political career

Career in national politics
 2002-2004: Chairman of the Policy Council of the Social Movement
 since 2004: Member of the National Council of the Citizens' Platform
 1990-1998: Mayor and member of the town council in Cieszyn
 1998-2004: Regional Councillor of the Silesian Voivodeship
 1998-2002: Marshal of the Silesian Voivodeship
 1995-2001: Vice-Chairman of the Council of European Municipalities and Regions
 2000-2004: Member of the Organisation of the Assembly of European Regions (ARE)
 2004: Member of the World Council of United Cities and Local Governments
 2000-2004: Member of the National Council for Regional Policy
 since 2003: Member of the Committee for National Spatial Planning, Polish Academy of Sciences (PAN)

Member of the European Parliament, 2004–present
Olbrycht has been a Member of the European Parliament since the 2004 European elections. In parliament, he has since served on the Committee on Regional Development (2004-2014), the Committee on Budgetary Control (2009-2011) and the Committee on Budgets (since 2014). In the latter capacity, he is the parliament's co-rapporteur (alongside Margarida Marques) on the European Union's Multiannual Financial Framework (MFF) for 2021–2027.

In addition to his committee assignments, Olbrycht has been part of the parliament's delegations for relations with China (2004-2009); Albania, Bosnia and Herzegovina, Serbia, Montenegro and Kosovo (2009-2014); the countries of Southeast Asia and the Association of Southeast Asian Nations (2014-2019); and Canada (since 2019). He also chairs the URBAN Intergroup and is a member of the European Internet Forum.

Following the 2019 elections, Olbrycht was part of a cross-party working group in charge of drafting the European Parliament's four-year work program on digitization.

Within the centre-right European People's Party Group (EPP) group, Olbrycht is one of the deputies of chairman Manfred Weber. In 2021, he was appointed to the group's task force for proposing changes to its rules of procedure to allow for “the possibility of the collective termination of membership of a group of Members rather than just individual membership”, alongside Esteban González Pons, Othmar Karas, Esther de Lange and Paulo Rangel.

Decorations and awards
 Knight's Cross of the Order of Polonia Restituta (2000)
 Emperor-Maximilian-Prize (2005)
 Franciszka Cegielska's Rose Award (2010)
 MEP Award in the economic and monetary affairs category (2018)

See also 
 2004 European Parliament election in Poland

References

External links
  
 
 

 

 

 
 
 

1952 births
Living people
People from Cieszyn Silesia 
People from Rybnik
Mayors of places in Poland
Jagiellonian University alumni
Civic Platform MEPs
MEPs for Poland 2004–2009
MEPs for Poland 2009–2014
MEPs for Poland 2014–2019
MEPs for Poland 2019–2024
Voivodeship marshals of Poland